Penrith and The Border is a constituency in Cumbria represented in the House of Commons of the UK Parliament since 2019 by Neil Hudson, a Conservative.

History
Penrith and The Border was first contested in 1950 since which it has to date been generally a safe Conservative seat and on rare occasions a marginal. The Conservatives came close to losing the seat in a 1983 by-election, when the former cabinet minister 'Willie' Whitelaw became the leader of the House of Lords: the by-election took place a mere seven weeks after his success in the 1983 general election. Since that year the Liberal Democrats have come second behind the Conservatives until the 2015 general election when they came fourth. At the two subsequent general elections they have come third.

History of boundaries

1950–1983: The Urban District of Penrith, and the Rural Districts of Alston with Garrigill, Border, Penrith, and Wigton.

1983–1997: The District of Eden wards of Alston Moor, Appleby, Appleby Bongate, Askham, Brough, Crosby Ravensworth, Dacre, Eamont, Greystoke, Hartside, Hesket, Kirkby Thore, Kirkoswald, Langwathby, Lazonby, Long Marton, Lowther, Penrith East, Penrith North, Penrith South, Penrith West, Skelton, Ullswater, and Warcop, the City of Carlisle wards of Arthuret, Brampton, Burgh, Dalston, Great Corby and Geltsdale, Hayton, Irthing, Lyne, St Cuthbert Without, Stanwix Rural, and Wetheral, and the District of Allerdale wards of Aspatria, Boltons, Marsh, Silloth, Tarns, Wampool, Warnell, Waver, and Wigton.

1997–2010: The District of Eden, the City of Carlisle wards of Arthuret, Brampton, Great Corby and Geltsdale, Hayton, Irthing, Lyne, Stanwix Rural, and Wetheral, and the District of Allerdale wards of Marsh, Wampool, Warnell, and Wigton.

2010–present: The District of Eden, the City of Carlisle wards of Brampton, Great Corby and Geltsdale, Hayton, Irthing, Longtown and Rockcliffe, Lyne, and Stanwix Rural, and the District of Allerdale wards of Warnell and Wigton.

The constituency was created in 1950 by merging part of Penrith and Cockermouth with North Cumberland. It was redrawn in 1983 by taking in most of the northern part of the old Westmorland constituency and in 1997 by taking in the Kirkby Stephen and Tebay areas of the pre-1997 Westmorland and Lonsdale constituency by doing so the constituency covered the entire district of Eden.  The constituency also includes parts of Allerdale and Carlisle districts but has been losing parts of these areas to other seats at each boundary review.

Penrith and The Border is the largest constituency by area in England. Despite the name, it only includes part of the English border with Scotland. The neighbouring constituency of Hexham (together with Berwick-upon-Tweed) also takes in the border area.  The name stems from the fact that when the constituency was first created it consisted of the Penrith Rural and Urban Districts, the Border Rural District and also the Alston with Garrigill Rural District.

Constituency profile
A heavily undulating, mostly farmed terrain dotted by market towns and historic villages, with wooded mountainsides and heath-covered tops, the constituency is focused on the Eden Valley between the Pennines and the Lake District, with the vale of the River Irthing above Carlisle.  In the north towards Scotland are 8 of its 42 wards all beside or in the market town of Brampton which sits beside Hadrian's Wall.

The constituency tends to have modest incomes, low unemployment and a rate of dependency on social housing lower than urban centres.

Members of Parliament
The seat was represented for nearly three decades by William Whitelaw, who served as a cabinet minister in various capacities during Conservative governments of the 1970s and 1980s and later joined the House of Lords. 

His successor, the former Conservative Chief Whip and junior minister, David Maclean, sat as MP from 1983 to 2010, when he stood down due to the state of his health; he was diagnosed with multiple sclerosis in 1996.  

Maclean was succeeded by Rory Stewart in May 2010. In September 2019 Rory Stewart had the Conservative whip withdrawn and therefore sat as an Independent MP. 

At the December 2019 General Election, Neil Hudson of the Conservative Party became the new MP.

Elections

Elections in the 2010s

Elections in the 2000s

Elections in the 1990s

Elections in the 1980s

Elections in the 1970s

Elections in the 1960s

Elections in the 1950s

See also

 1983 Penrith and The Border by-election
 List of parliamentary constituencies in Cumbria

Notes

References

Parliamentary constituencies in North West England
Constituencies of the Parliament of the United Kingdom established in 1950
Politics of Cumbria
Politics of Allerdale